This is a list of Michigan Wolverines baseball seasons. The Michigan Wolverines baseball program is a college baseball team that represents the University of Michigan in the Big Ten Conference of the National Collegiate Athletic Association. Michigan has played their home games at Ray Fisher Stadium in Ann Arbor, Michigan since 1923. 

The Wolverines have won 35 conference regular season championships, ten conference tournaments, and have appeared in the NCAA Division I Baseball Championship 26 times, advancing to the College World Series on eight occasions, and have won the national championship twice.

Season results

Notes

References

Michigan Wolverines baseball seasons
Michigan
Michigan Wolverines baseball seasons